Abdoulaye is a West African masculine given name and surname. It is equivalent to the Arabic names Abdallah or Abdullah ( ʿAbdu-llahi; servant of God), given name of Muhammad's father.
People with this name include:

Given name

Footballers
Abdoulaye Keita (Guinean footballer), Guinean goalkeeper of the 1970s and 1980s
Abdoulaye Sarr (born 1951), Senegalese coach
Abdoulaye Kaloga (born 1959), Malian midfielder
Abdoulaye Sogue (born 1965), Senegalese striker
Abdoulaye Traoré (Ivorian footballer) (born 1967), striker
Abdoulaye Traoré (Burkinabé footballer) (born 1974), midfielder
Abdoulaye Coulibaly (footballer born 1976), Ivorian defender
Abdoulaye Demba (born 1976), Malian forward
Abdoulaye Faye (born 1978), Senegalese defender
Abdoulaye Khouma Keita (born 1978), Senegalese defender
Abdoulaye Soulama (born 1979), Burkinabé goalkeeper
Abdoulaye Camara (born 1980), Malian defender
Abdoulaye Méïté (born 1980), Ivorian centre-back
Abdoulaye Soumaré (born 1980), Burundian striker
Abdoulaye Djire (born 1981), Ivorian midfielder
Abdoulaye Diawara (born 1981), Ivorian defender
Abdoulaye Kapi Sylla (born 1982), Guinean midfielder
Abdoulaye Cissé (born 1983), Côte d'Ivoire-born Burkinabé striker 
Abdoulaye Diawara (footballer born 1983), Malian midfielder
Abdoulaye Djibril Diallo (born 1983), Guinean midfielder
Abdoulaye Ndoye (born 1983), Senegal-born Equatoguinean midfielder
Abdoulaye Niang (born 1983), Senegalese midfielder
Abdoulaye Sekou Sampil (born 1984), Senegal-born French striker
Abdoulaye Ouzérou (born 1985), Beninese striker
Abdoulaye Soumah (born 1985), Guinean goalkeeper
Abdoulaye Baldé (footballer) (born 1986), French striker of Guinean descent
Abdoulaye Diarra (born 1986), Ivorian midfielder
Abdoulaye Samaké (born 1987), Malian goalkeeper
Abdoulaye Coulibaly (footballer born 1988), Senegalese goalkeeper
Abdoulaye Maïga (born 1988), Malian defender
Abdoulaye Seck (footballer, born 1988), Senegalese footballer
Abdoulaye Seck (footballer, born 1992), Senegalese footballer
Abdoulaye Fall (born 1989), Senegalese defensive midfielder
Abdoulaye Bamba (born 1990), Ivorian right back
Abdoulaye Keita (footballer, born 1990), French goalkeeper
Abdoulaye Ba (born 1991), Senegalese defender
Abdoulaye Sileye Gaye (born 1991), Mauritanian midfielder
Abdoulaye Koffi (born 1991), Ivorian forward
Abdoulaye Diallo (born 1992), Senegalese goalkeeper
Abdoulaye Sané (born 1992), Senegalese striker
Abdoulaye Sissoko (born 1992), Malian midfielder
Abdoulaye Doucouré (born 1993), French midfielder of Malian descent
Abdoulaye Cissé (Guinean footballer) (born 1994), defender
Abdoulaye Diarra (footballer, born 1994), Malian midfielder
Abdoulaye Keita (footballer, born 1994), Malian defensive midfielder
Abdoulaye Touré (footballer) (born 1994), French midfielder of Guinean descent

Other sportspeople
Abdoulaye Seye (1934–2011), Senegalese sprinter
Abdoulaye Thiam (born 1984), Senegalese fencer
Abdoulaye Wagne (born 1981), Senegalese middle-distance runner
Abdoulaye M'Baye (basketball) (born 1988), French basketball player
Abdoulaye Loum (born 1991), French basketball player

Artists, musicians, and writers
Abdoulaye Sadji (1910–1961), Senegalese writer and teacher
Abdoulaye Mamani (1932–1993), Nigerien poet, novelist and trade unionist 
Abdoulaye Ascofaré (born 1949), Malian filmmaker
Abdoulaye Diakité (born 1951), Senegalese djembe drummer
Abdoulaye Diabaté (born 1956), Senegalese singer and guitarist
Oxmo Puccino (born Abdoulaye Diarra, 1974), Malian hip hop musician

Politicians
Abdoulaye Touré (c. 1920–1985), Guinean politician
Abdoulaye Wade (born 1926), Senegalese politician, former president
Abdoulaye Sékou Sow (1931–2013), Malian politician, former prime minister
Abdoulaye Yerodia Ndombasi (born 1933), Congolese politician, former foreign minister and vice-president
Abdoulaye Hamani Diori (1945–2011), Nigerien politician and businessman
Abdoulaye Bathily (born 1947), Senegalese politician and diplomat
Abdoulaye Baldé (politician) (born 1964), Senegalese politician
Abdoulaye Diop (born 1968), Malian diplomat
Abdoulaye Maïga, ambassador of Mali to the United States in 1960.
Abdoulaye Idrissa Maïga (born 11 March 1958), prime minister of Mali from 8 April 2017 to 29 December 2017.
Abdoulaye Maïga (officer) (born 1981), appointed interim prime minister of Mali in August 2022.
Abdoulaye Mar Dieye, Senegalese United Nations official
Abdoulaye Diouf Sarr, Senegalese government minister

Surname
Maikano Abdoulaye (1932–2011), Cameroonian politician
Souley Abdoulaye (born 1965), Nigerien politician
Brahim Abdoulaye (born 1970), Chadian sprinter
Bruce Abdoulaye (born 1982), Congolese football right back
Djidéo Abdoulaye (born 1988), Chadian football player
Adjaratou Abdoulaye, Togolese politician
Hassan Abdoulaye, Chadian football player